Minuscule 875 (in the Gregory-Aland numbering), ε1004 (von Soden), is a 10th-century Greek minuscule manuscript of the New Testament on parchment. It has complex contents.

Description 

The codex contains the text of the four Gospels on 228 parchment leaves (size ). The text is written in one column per page, 23 lines per page.
According to Scrivener it is a fine codex.

There is also a division according to the Ammonian Sections, with references to the Eusebian Canons.

Formerly it was known as Codex Columnensis 86.

Text 
The Greek text of the codex is a representative of the Byzantine text-type. Hermann von Soden classified it to the textual family Kx. Kurt Aland did not place it in any Category.
According to the Claremont Profile Method it represents textual family Kx in Luke 1 and Luke 20. In Luke 10 no profile was made. It creates textual pair with 971.

History 

F. H. A. Scrivener and C. R. Gregory did not date the codex. Currently the manuscript is dated by the INTF to the 10th century.

It 1437 it was bought by Bartolomeo de Rimbertinis from Florence. In 1480 Nicolas de Cobitis gave it to the monastery in Florence. It once belonged to Giovanni Carlo de Salviatis.

The manuscript was added to the list of New Testament manuscripts by Scrivener (692e), Gregory (875e). Gregory saw it in 1886.

Currently the manuscript is housed at the Vatican Library (Gr. 2247), in Rome.

See also 

 List of New Testament minuscules
 Biblical manuscript
 Textual criticism
 Minuscule 873

References

Further reading

External links 
 

Greek New Testament minuscules
10th-century biblical manuscripts
Manuscripts of the Vatican Library